Broadbury Castle is an archaeological earthwork close to Beaworthy in Devon, England. It comprises a single bank and ditch which enclose an almost square piece of ground measuring 58m by 68m across. Historic England state that it is the remains of a Roman marching camp, although firm evidence for this is lacking and an alternative interpretation as an Iron Age or Roman-British civilian settlement has also been proposed. 

The site is legally protected as a scheduled monument, under the Ancient Monuments and Archaeological Areas Act 1979

Broadbury Castle was a familiar place for fox hunting, with Devon newspaper accounts stretching over fifty years.

References

Roman fortifications in Devon
Archaeological sites in Devon
Roman fortified camps in England